Heinrich Moritz Willkomm (29 June 1821, Herwigsdorf – 26 August 1895, Schloss Wartenberg in Wartenberg am Rollberg, Bohemia) was a German academic and botanist. 

He studied medicine at the University of Leipzig, later being named a professor of natural history in Tharandt (1855). In 1868 he was appointed professor of botany and director of the botanical garden at the University of Dorpat, and from 1874 to 1892, maintained similar roles at the University of Prague.

In 1844–45 and 1850–51, he collected plants in Spain and Portugal. His main herbarium from these expeditions is kept in Coimbra and his personal herbarium was taken to Genoa. Following his tenure at Dorpat, he embarked on a scientific excursion to the Balearic Islands.

His book Die Wunder des Mikroskops ("The Miracles of the Microscope"; 1856, 4th ed. 1878) contributed to the growing movement to popularize science in Germany.

The grass genus Willkommia (family Poaceae) is named in his honor. He is also honoured in the naming of a fungi genus in 1891, Willkommlangea (jointly with Johan Lange (1818-1898), who was a prominent Danish born botanist).

Written works 
Willkomm's "Grundzüge der Pflanzenverbreitung auf der Iberischen Halbinsel" (Outline of plant distribution in the Iberian Peninsula) was included in Engler and Drude's "Die Vegetation der Erde". Among his numerous written efforts are the following:
 Zwei Jahre in Spanien und Portugal (1847)
 Sertum floræ hispanicæ (1852)
 Wanderungen durch die nordöstlichen und centralen Provinzen Spaniens (1852)
 Die Strand- und Steppengebiete der iberischen Halbinsel und deren Vegetation (1852)
 Die Halbinsel der Pyrenäen (1855)
 Die Wunder des Mikroskops oder die Welt im kleinsten Raum (1856, several editions).
 Icones et descriptiones plantarum... Europæ austro-occidentalis, præcipue Hispaniæ (two volumes, 168 illustrations, (1852–56).
 Prodromus florae hispanicae (1861-1880, supplement 1893), with Johan Lange.
 Die mikroskopischen Feinde des Waldes (1866–67) 
 Mikroskopets under eller en verld i det minsta; Stockholm : Em. Girons, 1871, with A M Selling. 
 Forstliche Flora von Deutschland und Oesterreich (1875, new edition 1887).
 Spanien und die Balearen (1876)
 Deutschlands Laubhölzer im Winter (third edition, 1880)
 Illustrationes floræ Hispaniæ insularumque Balearium (1881–91).

References 

 List of written works copied from an equivalent article at the Swedish Wikipedia, source listed as: Nordisk familjebok (biography)

1821 births
1895 deaths
People from Görlitz (district)
People from the Kingdom of Saxony
Academic staff of the Royal Saxon Academy of Forestry
19th-century German botanists
Botanical illustrators
Leipzig University alumni
Academic staff of the University of Tartu
Academic staff of Charles University